North and South Brother Islands are uninhabited islands in the Indian Ocean, part of the Andaman Archipelago.
They belong to the South Andaman administrative district, part of the Indian union territory of Andaman and Nicobar Islands.

Geography

There is a lighthouse at the top of the tallest hill on North Brother, established 1993.

The Lighthouse is about half a Km from the landing point.
The islands are almost flat, thickly wooded islands fringed by reef around.

Administration
Politically, The Islands are part of Little Andaman Tehsil.

Demographics 
The islands are uninhabited.

Image gallery

References

External links

Archipelagoes of the Andaman and Nicobar Islands
South Andaman district
Uninhabited islands of India